Palaia pulchra is a species of skink found in Papua New Guinea.

References

Reptiles described in 1903
Taxa named by George Albert Boulenger
Skinks of New Guinea